The Korean Central News Agency (KCNA) is the state news agency of North Korea. The agency portrays the views of the North Korean government for both domestic and foreign consumption. It was established on December 5, 1946 and now features online coverage.

Organization
KCNA is the only news agency in North Korea. It daily reports news for all the news organizations in the country including newspapers, radio and television broadcasts via Korean Central Television and the Korean Central Broadcasting Station within the country. KCNA works under the Korean Central Broadcasting Committee, through which it is ultimately controlled by the Workers' Party of Korea's Propaganda and Agitation Department. In December 1996, KCNA began publishing its news articles on the Internet with its web server located in Japan. Since October 2010, stories have been published on a new site, controlled from Pyongyang, and output has been significantly increased to include world stories with no specific link to North Korea as well as news from countries that have strong DPRK ties.

In addition to Korean, KCNA releases news translated into English, Russian, Chinese, Japanese, and Spanish. Access to its website, along with other North Korean news sites, has been blocked by South Korea since 2004 and can be accessed only through the government's authorization. It is also alleged to conduct clandestine intelligence collection.

Based in the capital Pyongyang, at 1 Potonggang-dong, Potonggang District, KCNA has bureaus in several municipalities. KCNA also has press exchange agreements with around 46 foreign news agencies, including South Korea's Yonhap. Its closest partners, however, are Itar-Tass and Xinhua News Agency. KCNA has correspondents and bureaus in six countries, including Russia and China. The correspondents are located in Russia, China, Cuba, Iran, India, and Egypt. KCNA also collaborates with Reuters and the Associated Press, the latter of which has a permanent bureau in Pyongyang. KCNA journalists have trained abroad with the BBC and Reuters. KCNA is a member of Organization of Asia-Pacific News Agencies since 1982. The agency employs 800 people.

According to its website, KCNA "speaks for the Workers' Party of Korea and the DPRK government". The agency has been described as the "official organ." In June 1964 on one of his first official activities, Kim Jong-il visited KCNA headquarters and said the agency should be "propagating the revolutionary ideology of the Leader (Kim Il-sung) widely throughout the world." However, the agency is also said to offer a unique insight into the North Korean "mentality."

A talk given to officials at KCNA on June 12, 1964, outlines the function of the news agency:

Under the principle and guideline on the work of ideological propaganda and agitation put by the country's ruling party, the Workers' Party of Korea, the agency generally reports only good news about the country that is intended to encourage its people and project a positive image abroad. Nonetheless, it has on occasion acknowledged food shortages in the country. The Ryongchon disaster was also reported in April 2004, after a delay of two days.

The Director General of KCNA is Kim Chang-gwang. KCNA has a sports team in the annual Paektusan Prize Games of Civil Servants.

Recurring themes

KCNA articles generally revolve on several specific themes (examples in reference section):
 Detailing performances of cultural events, usually attended by various dignitaries.
 Decrying the actions and attitudes of the United States, Japan, South Korea and other nations, particularly concerning military cooperation, historical events or trade among those nations. Personal attacks on American, Japanese and South Korean leaders are not unknown.
 Airing the official DPRK position on ongoing disputes with Japan over such matters as Chongryon and comfort women.
 Noting the celebration of DPRK events and ideas in other countries.
 Calling for the reunification of Korea under the Juche ideology.
 Promoting the popularity of Kim Il-sung, Kim Jong-il, and Kim Jong-un. Such instances would detail the daily routines of the leaders, or praise from friendly organisations in other countries.
 Communications, visits and gifts (it does not name the particular gift) to and from various like-minded or friendly nations. Regarding the number of gifts, KCNA claimed that former leader Kim Il-sung receives "2,910 a year, 243 a month and 8 a day."
 New technological developments, such as a preservation agent for the Kimjongilia flower, a new kind of pesticide and "blood purifying" rings and bracelets [a quack remedy], amongst others.
Emphasizing the names of Kim Il-sung, Kim Jong-il, and Kim Jong-un by enlarging their names on the text. By law, names of the Great Leaders must be larger than the rest of the text and be written fully on one line.
References to institutes, groups or centres "for the study of the Juche idea". For example, a KCNA report from June 12, 2011 claimed that "The Brazilian Center for the Study of the Juche Idea was inaugurated with due ceremony at Sao Paulo University on June 4". The article also refers to an unnamed "chairman" (who presumably presided over the ceremony), but this supposed event was not reported by a source other than KCNA as of the date of the article (eight days after the ceremony was alleged to have occurred).

Editorial practices
KCNA employs language, such as "traitors", "warmongers" or "human scum", for governments (especially South Korea and the United States), organizations and individuals, who are characteristic of those terms. In contrast, Kim Jong-un, Kim Jong-il and Kim Il-sung are credited for their "outstanding wisdom", "unique abilities" or "noble virtue".

New Year editorials
As a tradition since 1996, KCNA, along with the three main state run newspapers in North Korea, publishes a joint New Year editorial that outlines the country's policies for the year. The editorials usually offer praise for the Songun policy, the government and leadership, and encourage the growth of the nation. They are also critical of the policies of South Korea, Japan, the United States and Western governments towards the country.
On January 1, 2006 the agency sent out a joint-editorial from North Korea's state newspapers calling for the withdrawal of American troops from South Korea. While annual January 1 editorials are a tradition among the papers, that year's brought attention from Western media outlets, by calling for a "nationwide campaign for driving out the U.S. troops". The editorial made several references to Korean reunification. The 2009 editorial received similar attention, as criticism of United States policy was absent, and the admission of severe economic problems in the country. The editorial also made reference to denuclearisation on the Korean peninsula, in what analysts claimed was a "hopeful" sign. This was echoed again  in its 2010 editorial, which called for an end to hostilities with the United States and a nuclear free Korean Peninsula.

The 2011 joint editorial edition, aside from its calls for a denuclearized Korea and for a slowdown of tensions between the two Koreas, has for the first time, mentioned the rising light industries of the DPRK, given as a reason for an upcoming upsurge in the national economy in the new year and for the achievement of the Kangsong Taeguk national mission.

The 2012 joint editorial edition, the first under Kim Jong-un's leadership, started with a great tribute to Kim Jong-il and aside from recurring calls for improving inter-Korean relations and for the fulfillment of the October 4 Declaration of 2007, also called on the whole nation to give priority to do Kim Jong-il's 2012 mission of Strong and Prosperous Nation, continue his and his father Kim Il-sung's legacies to the entire country and the socialist cause, and to build up and encourage the various sectors that compose the nation to become contributors to national progress in all areas at all costs.

This practice ended in 2013 when Kim Jong-un delivered the first New Year speech on television in 19 years.

Censorship
Following the purge and execution of Jang Song-thaek, KCNA conducted its largest censorship operation on its webpage. Some 35,000 articles of Korean-language original reporting were deleted. Counting translations, a total of 100,000 articles were removed. Additionally, some articles were edited to omit Jang's name. Not all of the deleted articles mentioned Jang directly.

See also

 Communications in North  Korea
 Media of North Korea
 Yonhap News Agency, South Korean equivalent

References

Citations

Works cited

External links

 
 STALIN  archives (January 1996–present)
 Older archives at Defense Technical Information Center
 KCNA Watch archives by NK News
 Kim Jong-il (1964): "A Talk to the Officials of the Korean Central News Agency June 12, 1964" at the Korean Friendship Association

1946 establishments in North Korea
Mass media in Pyongyang
News agencies based in North Korea
North Korean news websites
North Korean propaganda organizations
Organizations established in 1946